Patella candei, also known as the sun limpet, is a species of sea snail, a true limpet, a marine gastropod mollusk in the family Patellidae, one of the families of true limpets.

Description
The naturalist Alcide d'Orbigny named the gastropod after Ferdinand de Candé.

The size of the shell varies between 20 mm and 80 mm.

Distribution
This species occurs in the Atlantic Ocean off the Azores, Canary Islands, Madeira and the Savage Islands.

References

 Orbigny A. D. d' (1839–1842). Mollusques, Echinodermes, Foraminifères et Polypiers recueillis aux Iles Canaries par MM. Webb et Berthelot et décrits par Alcide d'Orbigny. Mollusques. Béthune, Paris : 117 p., pl. 1–7, 7B (p. 1–24 Aug. 1839), 25–48 (Sept. 1839), 49–72 (Oct-1839), 73–104 (Jan. 1840), 105–136 (Mar. 1840), 137–143 (Apr. 1840), 145–152 (Aug. 1842) pl. 1 (Jul. 1836), 2 (Dec. 1836), 3 (May 1842), 4–5 (June 1840), 7 (May 1842), 6,7B (Aug. 1842)

External links
 

Patellidae
Gastropods described in 1840
Molluscs of the Azores
Molluscs of Madeira
Fauna of the Savage Islands
Molluscs of the Canary Islands